Exocarya sclerioides is a grass like plant in the family Cyperaceae. This species first appeared in the scientific literature in 1875, as Cladium sclerioides. It was transferred to Exocarya in  1877 by the systematic botanist George Bentham.

References

Cyperaceae
Flora of New South Wales
Flora of Queensland
Plants described in 1875
Taxa named by Ferdinand von Mueller